James Alfred Field Jr. (March 9, 1916 – June 24, 1996) was an American historian. He taught at Swarthmore College from 1947 to 1986, where he was the Isaac H. Clothier Professor of History and International Relations. He specialized in American naval history and US foreign relations. He served in the US Navy from 1942 to 1946, and saw combat in the Pacific theater. He received his BA, MA, and PhD degrees from Harvard University.

Bibliography

References

United States Navy personnel of World War II
American naval historians
Harvard University alumni
Swarthmore College faculty
People from Newtown Township, Delaware County, Pennsylvania
1916 births
1996 deaths
20th-century American historians
20th-century American male writers
American male non-fiction writers
Historians from Pennsylvania